Richard C. Lindley (born 1949) is a British philosopher.

Life
Richard Lindley was born in Manchester in 1949. He studied Politics, Philosophy and Economics at Lincoln College, Oxford.

Lindley was a founder member of the Society for Applied Philosophy, and a Lecturer in Philosophy at the University of Bradford.

Works
 The philosophy of mind: a bibliography. Oxford: Sub-faculty of Philosophy, University of Oxford, 1977.
 What Philosophy Does. London: Open Books, 1978. 
 Autonomy (Issues in Political Theory). Palgrave Macmillan, 1986. 
 (with Jeremy Holmes) The Values of Psychotherapy. Oxford; New York: Oxford University Press, 1989. Studies in Bioethics. With a foreword by R. D. Hinshelwood.

References

External links

1949 births
Living people
Writers from Manchester
Alumni of Lincoln College, Oxford
Academics of the University of Bradford